Francis Powers may refer to:
 Francis Powers (actor) (1865–1940), American silent film actor, writer, and director
 Francis Gary Powers (1929–1977), American U-2 spy plane pilot
 Francis J. Powers (1895–1977), American sportswriter
 Buddy Powers, collegiate ice hockey player and coach
 Francis Fisher Powers, 19th century singing teacher of Ernest Trow Carter
 Francis Powers Starkie, father of W. J. M. Starkie